Lou Esa (born January 10, 1952) is an American former professional heavyweight boxer from Wayne, New Jersey, who had 26 fights with 16 knockouts in 19 wins.

Amateur career
Esa began his amateur boxing career at the age of 17 in New Jersey, accumulating a record of 7–1 with 7 knockouts. His only loss was to future heavyweight champion Larry Holmes. At the age of 20, while preparing for the Olympic trials, Esa was hit in the face with a bottle and required over 300 facial stitches, which ended his amateur career.

Professional career
After playing defensive end in football for Saint Peter's College in New Jersey, Esa tried out for the Miami Dolphins. He suffered a helmet strike to his knee which abruptly ended any football career. A few months later, after he successfully rehabilitated his knee, Esa heard that boxing legend Muhammad Ali was training at a local gym, so he headed down for the opportunity to meet his hero. While at the gym watching Ali, Esa hung out in the back and worked on the heavy bag. Angelo Dundee was impressed with Esa's technique and power and introduced himself. The next day Esa met with the Dundee brothers to discuss his professional career.

Dundee introduced Esa to Murray Gaby who became his manager and Dwayne Simpson who became his trainer. Esa fought under the Mendoza Group, who he credits for helping his professional boxing career. A few weeks later, on July 22, 1975, Esa made his professional debut at the Miami Beach Convention Hall against James Edwards. Esa won his first five fights, all by first-round knockout, before suffering his first loss in April 1976. Esa came back and won 13 of 15 fights with one draw and one loss by unanimous decision.

In October 1977, Esa fought a six-round undercard bout in Las Vegas against the newly turned professional and future heavyweight champion John Tate. Esa, who had been arrested in his hotel room and had spent the previous night in jail, was knocked out in the third round. The fight's promoters Lou Duva and Bob Arum were criticized for promoting a mismatch.

Following losses in three of four fights during the next three years, Esa's career ended in 1981. According to his cornerman, Ferdie Pacheco, Esa had a precarious reputation as a journeyman who "couldn't take a hard rap" and was "never in shape" enough to last more than a couple of rounds.

In 2012, Lou Esa was inducted into the New Jersey Hall of Fame.

Professional boxing record

| style="text-align:center;" colspan="8"|19 Wins (16 knockouts, 3 decisions),  6 Losses, 1 Draws
|-  style="text-align:center; background:#e3e3e3;"
|  style="border-style:none none solid solid; "|Res.
|  style="border-style:none none solid solid; "|Record
|  style="border-style:none none solid solid; "|Opponent
|  style="border-style:none none solid solid; "|Type
|  style="border-style:none none solid solid; "|Rd., Time
|  style="border-style:none none solid solid; "|Date
|  style="border-style:none none solid solid; "|Location
|- align=center
|Loss||19-6-1||align=left| Fossie Schmidt
|||||
|align=left|
|- align=center
|Loss||19-5||align=left| Barry Funches
|||||
|align=left|
|- align=center
|Win||19-4||align=left| David Starkey
|||||
|align=left|
|- align=center
|Loss||18-4||align=left| Bill Connell
|||||
|align=left|
|- align=center
|Loss||18-3||align=left| John Tate
|||||
|align=left|
|- align=center
|Loss||18-2-1||align=left| Roger Russell
|||||
|align=left|
|- align=center
|Win||18-1-1||align=left| Tommy Howard
|||||
|align=left|
|- align=center
|Win||17-1-1||align=left| John L. Johnson
|||||
|align=left|
|- align=center
|Win||16-1-1||align=left| Roger Russell
|||||
|align=left|
|- align=center
|Win||15-1-1||align=left| Willie Goodman
|||||
|align=left|
|- align=center
|Win||14-1-1||align=left| Jimmy Phillips
|||||
|align=left|
|- align=center
|Win||13-1-1||align=left| Leroy Diggs
|||||
|align=left|
|- align=center
|Win||12-1-1||align=left| Phil Fritz
|||||
|align=left|
|- align=center
|Win||11-1-1||align=left| Fred Wallace
|||||
|align=left|
|- align=center
|Win||10-1-1||align=left| Leroy Keane
|||||
|align=left|
|- align=center
|Win||9-1-1||align=left| Billy Grant
|||||
|align=left|
|- align=center
|Draw||8-1-1||align=left| Tom Prater
|||||
|align=left|
|- align=center
|Win||8-1||align=left| Moses Harrell
|||||
|align=left|
|- align=center
|Win||7-1||align=left| George Holden
|||||
|align=left|
|- align=center
|Win||6-1||align=left| Angelo Garafolo
|||||
|align=left|
|- align=center
|Loss||5-1||align=left| Sylvester Bump Kelly
|||||
|align=left|
|- align=center
|Win||5-0||align=left| Gene Idelette
|||||
|align=left|
|- align=center
|Win||4-0||align=left| Mike Green
|||||
|align=left|
|- align=center
|Win||3-0||align=left| Hydra Lacy
|||||
|align=left|
|- align=center
|Win||2-0||align=left| Clarence Morris
|||||
|align=left|
|- align=center
|Win||1-0||align=left| James Edwards
|||||
|align=left|

References

Further reading

1952 births
Living people
Boxers from New Jersey
Heavyweight boxers
American prisoners and detainees
Prisoners and detainees of the United States federal government
American male boxers
People from Wayne, New Jersey
Sportspeople from Passaic County, New Jersey